David S. D'Evelyn Junior/Senior High School (known as D'Evelyn) is a public secondary school near Lakewood, Colorado, United States. It is included in the Jefferson County R-1 public school district. While remaining an open public school without charter or magnet status, D'Evelyn consistently ranks among the top 100 high schools in the US. D’Evelyn’s academic tenets derive from the efforts of a volunteer council to create an "alternative educational environment" in the early 1990s. D’Evelyn’s eponymous founder, David S. D’Evelyn, died in a plane crash before the council's efforts resulted in the successful enactment of the Colorado Charter Schools Act of 1993 and the nascent school secured the "option school" status required to pursue its own academic objectives with a high degree of freedom from the district.

History

David D'Evelyn was influential in helping the Colorado Charter Schools Act of 1993 become law. He died in a plane crash shortly before the act went into effect.

At the same time the Colorado Charter Schools Act was going through the legislative process, the Dennison option school in Lakewood was straining at the limits of its site capacity providing a K-8 program. In response to the need to expand Dennison's program through high school, a group of parents proposed a combined junior and senior high school that would relocate the 7th and 8th grades from Dennison and add the high school at a rate of one grade level per year. Naming themselves the Initiating Committee, they submitted an application to the Jefferson County School Board to operate as an educational option school with a request to be considered for a charter school if the educational option request was denied on December 17, 1993.

The charter school application was denied by the school board on March 17, 1994, citing that the concept set forth in the charter application had been approved as an educational option. A memorandum of understanding was signed on April 4, 1994 to establish the school as an extension of the Dennison program with Dr. Lloyd Carlton, principal of Dennison, as the principal overseeing both programs for the 1994–1995 school year.

In August 1994, the school commenced classes in the building formerly occupied by Manning Junior High School at 3200 West 32nd Avenue in Golden, Colorado with its first class of ninth graders and the seventh and eighth grade classes transferred to the school from the Dennison program. Succeeding years saw the first class advance in grade until the school served a full 7–12 program in the 1997–1998 school year.

A bond issue passed by Jefferson County voters in 1998 funded a new building for the school, which opened at the school's present location in 2001.

On September 23, 2012, the school was visited by Republican presidential candidate Mitt Romney during his campaign.

Campus
The Jefferson County school district acquired  of the historic Fehringer Ranch property during master planning for the area in the late 1990s. Funds to build the new campus were approved in a school bond election in 1998. A formal groundbreaking ceremony took place in early 2000 and the school's grand opening was on August 25, 2001.

The campus was designed by Slater Paull & Associates. A design advisory group that included steering committee members, teachers, and parents worked with the design team to develop the school's design concept and reflect classical academic architecture. The school's design was part of the 2002 Exhibition of School Planning & Architecture judged by the Council of Educational Facility Planners.

The school is situated next to Fehringer Ranch Park on the west and the Rocky Mountain Deaf School on the east.

Student body

Forty percent of seventh grade students graduate from Dennison Elementary School, D'Evelyn's predecessor and feeder school and the other sixty percent enroll through a random lottery or from sibling priority in the lottery pool. Eighth and ninth grade admission is also through the random lottery system and the school does not permit enrollment after the beginning of ninth grade. During the 2020-2021 school year, 94 students were eligible for free and reduced-price lunches. 
	
Enrollment per grade (2020-2021):

Demographics (2020-2021):
 
54.4% - Female
45.6% - Male	
 70.1% - Caucasian/White	
 13.0% - Hispanic	
 11.4% - Asian	
 4.0% - Multiracial		
 1.1% - African American
 0.4% - American Indian/Alaska Native
 <0.1% - Native Hawaiian/Pacific Islander

Athletics
D'Evelyn teams primarily compete in Colorado High School Activities Association (CHSAA) competition in the 4A class, a designation for mid-sized schools. Prior to 2004, the school was in the 3A class.

The girls' soccer team won their first state championship at the 4A class in 2017.

The D'Evelyn boys' cross-country team won the 3A team state title in 2001, 2002 and 2003.

The boys' track and field team shared the 3A team state title with Eagle Valley in 2004.

The teams host the annual D'Evelyn Dash 5k race.

The boys' golf team won the 4A state title in 2008.

The girls' tennis team won the 3A state title in 2017 and 2021.

The cheerleading team dates back to the school's first year, followed by the formation of the pom squad in 1998. D'Evelyn won the 3A cheerleading and pom state championships in 2002 and the 3A pom state championship in 2003.

Marching band
The marching band formed in the summer of 1996.

D'Evelyn won multiple 2A state championships:
 2011, "Pandora,"
 2012, "Conflict"
 2013, "To Soar"
 2014, "All Souls' Night"
 2015, "Stained Glass"
 2016, "Friendly Skies

In 2021, the band was selected to perform "American Patrol" in the virtual "Parade Across America" for the inauguration of President Joe Biden. They were the only group selected to represent Colorado in the event.

High school band and orchestra
Both the high school band and the orchestra were selected by audition to perform in the statewide CMEA Clinic/Conference: the orchestra in 2013, and the band in 2014. Recorded auditions are submitted in the spring, and only two or three groups statewide are selected to perform. The Orchestra won the "Outstanding Orchestra" award in class 3A at the 2015 Colorado West Music Performance Festival, held in Grand Junction.

Mathematics
D'Evelyn students competing in mathematics were the first-place team in the state for Mathcounts in 2001 and 2002, held places on the state's American Regions Mathematics League team.

Notable alumni
 Matthew Dominick '00 – member of the 2017 Astronaut Candidate Class

References

External links
 

Educational institutions established in 1994
Public high schools in Colorado
Jefferson County Public Schools (Colorado)
Education in Lakewood, Colorado
Schools in Jefferson County, Colorado
Public middle schools in Colorado
1994 establishments in Colorado